The Slitheen are a fictional family of massive, bipedal extraterrestrials from the British science fiction television series Doctor Who and are adversaries of the Ninth Doctor and later Sarah Jane Smith. The Slitheen are of the egg-laying calcium-based Raxacoricofallapatorian race native to Raxacoricofallapatorius, though many use "Slitheen" in referring to the race in general. Instinctive hunters trained to kill at a young age, Slitheen are a ruthless criminal sect whose main motivation is profit. They are also convicted on their home world, not willing to return to their planet due to a death sentence.

The Slitheen first appeared in the 2005 series episodes "Aliens of London" and "World War Three", and subsequently recur in later episodes of both Doctor Who and spin-off series The Sarah Jane Adventures.

Physical characteristics 
They have pairs of eyelids which move sideways, but have a nictitating membrane. They possess immense physical strength as they are strong enough to lift people off the ground and have a highly developed sense of smell, able to track a single target across a few city blocks, smell adrenaline and hormones in people, and can sense if one of their own dies. Female Raxacoricofallapatorians can produce poisons within their bodies to use against their enemies. Known methods of delivery include a poisoned dart that is formed in the finger and then fired, and exhalation of poisoned breath. Members of the Slitheen family have green skin, though there is variation in the skin tone of other Raxacoricofallapatorian families. In The Sarah Jane Adventures episode The Gift, members of the Slitheen-Blathereen family group are seen to have orange skin.

The Slitheen disguise themselves by fitting into the skins of their victims, using compression fields created by a collar worn around their necks to squeeze their huge size into a slightly smaller space. Initially the compression ratio was limited, so the disguises tended to be obese people, though some disguises are also slim people. This issue was overcome by new technology by the time of The Lost Boy, in which the skins of thinner people were used (by the time of "From Raxacoricofallapatorius with Love" short people could also be used). The exchange of gases that compression entails also builds up within the acquired skin, causing very loud flatulence in humans (the expelled gas smells like bad breath, which the Doctor noted was a form of calcium decay—though, in reality, bacteria that cause tooth decay are different from those that cause bad breath). This side-effect is also overcome by the newer technology in The Lost Boy.

Gas exchange 
When the Slitheen are in their skin suits they break wind loudly; they call this the gas exchange.
This can also be caused by over-eating. In The Gift, Sarah Jane and the gang destroy their source of food, a plant called Rackweed, which is native to Raxacoricofallapatorius. The Rackweed, when digested, is in their stomachs. Using the audio of every audio producing device in the vicinity, Mr Smith triggers a sound in the attic. This causes the Slitheen-Blathereen aliens to start farting uncontrollably and through the subsequent vibration of the sound and of their own farts, cause their stomachs to explode. Clyde then says that the Blathereen aliens had "farted themselves to death."

Vulnerabilities
Raxacoricofallapatorians are vulnerable to acetic acid, which reacts explosively—and fatally—with their bodies, making Slitheen allergic to vinegar, ketchup and Coca-Cola. One of the Raxacoricofallapatorian methods of execution is the lowering of the condemned into a cauldron of acetic acid, which is then heated to boiling. The acidity of the solution is formulated to dissolve the skin, allowing the internal organs to drop into the liquid while the condemned is still alive, reducing them to "soup" in a slow and painful death. In "World War Three", when a single Slitheen was electrocuted, the effects were transmitted to other Slitheen, even those across the city.

Appearances
When they first appeared in "Aliens of London" (set in 2006), the Pasameer-Day branch of the Slitheen had been in Great Britain for some time, having infiltrated various levels of British society, from community leaders and military personnel to mid-level politicians and government officials. Their intent was to instigate World War III and sell the radioactive remains of Earth to a depressed galactic economy as fuel for interstellar spacecraft. They staged the crash landing of an alien spaceship in central London, setting up a cybernetically augmented pig as an "extraterrestrial" body.

With the world in a state of heightened alert and panic, and with their commander Jocrassa assuming the role of Acting Prime Minister, they persuaded the United Nations to allow the United Kingdom to use its nuclear arsenal against the alien "massive weapons of destruction". Before the Slitheen could receive the launch codes, the Ninth Doctor arranged for a Harpoon missile to demolish 10 Downing Street, ending the scheme and killing all but one of them who managed to escape through an emergency teleport.

Jocrassa's sister Blon Fel-Fotch Pasameer-Day Slitheen, who had assumed the identity of Margaret Blaine of MI5, survived and reappeared in the episode "Boom Town". In the intervening six months, "Blaine" was elected as Lord Mayor of Cardiff and planned to leave Earth by using the energy from a new nuclear power station to interact with the Cardiff Rift, unconcerned that the planet would be destroyed in the process. Blon was stopped by the Doctor and his companions, and on exposure to the "heart" of the TARDIS, regressed to an egg. The Doctor took the egg to the hatcheries on Raxacoricofallapatorius so she could be given a second chance at life and be raised by a peaceful Raxacoricofallapatorian family.

Some years after the events of "World War Three", in Revenge of the Slitheen (set in either 2008 or 2009) another group of Slitheen infiltrated a construction company with plans to turn off the Sun and destroy Earth by draining the world's energy to avenge the deaths of the Pasameer-Days. It is mentioned that the Judoon have begun to force out the Slitheen, and the various other Raxacoricofallapatorian families have been working against them. The families Blathereen and Hostrazeen are mentioned as part of the Raxacoricofallapatorian ruling bodies, the Senate and the Grand Council. After Commander Glune was killed by Maria Jackson, Luke Smith was able to trick the Slitheen into resetting their machinery, which then malfunctioned and exploded. Two of the remaining Slitheen (Glune's siblings Kist and Bloorm) were killed, and the others escaped, including Kist's son Korst, the first child Slitheen to appear.

The Slitheen returned in The Lost Boy where, using the newer compression technology, two Slitheen named Dax and Bloorm posed as Luke's 'real' parents Jay and Heidi Stafford. They were under the command of Korst, who planned to avenge the deaths of his family. Another Slitheen (who was either a child or a short adult) appeared in the 2009 special "From Raxacoricofallapatorius with Love", masquerading as a galactic diplomat in an attempt to steal Sarah Jane's robot dog K-9.

The Slitheen appeared in the New Series Adventures novel The Monsters Inside by Stephen Cole. When the Ninth Doctor and Rose are arrested in the Justicia System in the year 2501, the Doctor shares a cell with Dram Fel-Fotch and Ecktosca Fel-Fotch Happen-Bar Slitheen, who claim that after the Earth incident, the remnants of the family went bankrupt and had become historians. The Slitheen had not actually given up business, and were in conflict with a more influential family, the Blathereen. When the Doctor and Rose defeat an attempted Blathereen takeover of the system, the Slitheen are pleased to see they can once again become the profit-holders of their race. The Blathereen were mentioned again in the Sarah Jane adventures episode Revenge of the Slitheen.

In the Series 3 finale of The Sarah Jane Adventures, The Gift, a pair of Slitheen-Blathereen from an intermarried line of the two families attempted to overrun Earth with Rakweed, a plant native to Raxacoricofallapatorius and used as an addictive vegetable.

In "Dalek", a stuffed Raxacoricofallapatorian arm was among a collection of alien artefacts owned by American billionaire Henry van Statten in the year 2012.

Rose mentioned the Slitheen Parliament of Raxacoricofallapatorius in "The Christmas Invasion" (though her impromptu speech was a pastiche of phrases she had picked up on her travels with the Doctor). A member of the Slitheen was captured by the Graske in the mini-episode "Attack of the Graske". Rose accused the Doctor (after his regeneration into the Tenth Doctor) of being a Slitheen in disguise in the 2005 Children in Need mini-episode and the Doctor makes a passing reference to the Slitheen and their skin-suits in "The Runaway Bride".

In the 2006 series episode "Love & Monsters", an alien called the Abzorbaloff, whose natural form is similar to that of the Slitheen, claims to be from Raxacoricofallapatorius's twin planet Clom. The Slitheen space ship from "Aliens of London" was also seen in a flashback in the same episode.

A Slitheen appears briefly in the Tenth Doctor novel The Nightmare of Black Island by Mike Tucker, created from Rose's memories, along with a Dalek and the Nestene Consciousness. The Slitheen are also briefly referenced by the Doctor in the same novel while speaking to a member of the Cynrog about hiding under human-like skinsuits. In the later novel, The Last Dodo, when the Doctor is asked if he has ever had a dream, he claims to have a recurring one in which a Slitheen on a rocking horse chases him.

The Slitheen appear in John Smith's A Journal of Impossible Things in the episode "Human Nature". The scribbled words by the drawing note that "it's always for money." A Fact File book about the Slitheen has also been released.

In the Torchwood episode "Reset", a newspaper clipping of Blon posing as Margaret Blaine, previously seen in "Boom Town", can be seen as Martha Jones enters the Hub.

The Doctor Who website features a segment called Captain Jack's Monster Files, narrated by John Barrowman, which provides information about alien species. An episode focusing on the Slitheen  shows a family tree that refers to a number of related families, all with the suffix, -een, with the exception of the 'Absorbalovian Rebels', referring to the Absorbaloff from "Love & Monsters", from the twin planet of Clom.

The Slitheen are mentioned in the audio book Wraith World, when Clyde Langer remarks he cannot understand why Luke and Rani would want to read about made up adventures, when they have faced Slitheen.

Though the Slitheen do not appear in "The Time of the Doctor", the Doctor mentions them as among the forces gathered around Trenzalore.

Doctor Who
"Aliens of London" / "World War Three" (2005)
"Boom Town" (2005)

Cameos
"The End of Time" (2010)
"The Time of the Doctor" (2013, mentioned only)
"Time Heist" (2014, photograph)

The Sarah Jane Adventures
Revenge of the Slitheen (2007)
The Lost Boy (2007)
The Gift (2009)

Cameos
The Nightmare Man (2010)

Audios
 The Taste of Death by Helen Goldwyn (2018)
 Death on the Mile by Donald McLeary (2018)
 Sync by Lisa McMullin (2019)

Novels
The Monsters Inside by Stephen Cole
The Slitheen Excursion by Simon Guerrier
Revenge of the Slitheen (novelisation of TV story) by Rupert Laight

Other appearances
"Attack of the Graske" (2005)
"From Raxacoricofallapatorius with Love" (2009)
Wraith World (2010)

Naming
One of the factors that helped the Doctor determine the home planet of the Slitheen was the fact that they had a hyphenated surname. Examples include the names Blon Fel-Fotch Passameer-Day Slitheen, and Jocrassa Fel-Fotch Passameer-Day Slitheen. Additional hyphenated forms in Slitheen names suggest family sub-units within the broader Slitheen family.

The Slitheen names mentioned in "Aliens of London" and "World War Three" are:
Blon Fel Fotch Pasameer-Day Slitheen
Sip Fel Fotch Pasameer-Day Slitheen
Jocrassa Fel Fotch Pasameer-Day Slitheen

In the book The Monsters Inside:
Dram Fel Fotch Happen-Bar Slitheen
Ecktosca Fel Fotch Happen-Bar Slitheen

In The Sarah Jane Adventures story Revenge of the Slitheen:
Kist Mag Thek Lutivon-Day Slitheen
Glune Fex Fize Sharlaveer-Slam Slitheen
Florm Rox Fey Fenerill-Slam Slitheen
Korst Gogg Thek Lutivon-Day Slitheen

In The Sarah Jane Adventures story The Lost Boy:
Dax Fex Fize Slitheen
Bloorm Vungah Bart Slitheen

Individuals murdered by the family and used as skinsuits include:
Joseph Green, MP for Hartley Dale and Chairman of the Parliamentary Commission on the Monitoring of Sugar Standards in Exported Confectionery
Margaret Blaine, a member of MI5
Oliver Charles, transport liaison of the Prime Minister
General Asquith, head of the British Army
Assistant Commissioner Strickland of the London Metropolitan Police.
Group Captain Tennant James of the Royal Air Force
Ewan McAllister, Deputy Secretary of the Scottish Parliament
Sylvia Dillane, chairman of the North Sea Boating Club.
Greg Blakeman, headmaster at Park Vale School
Tim Jeffery, a science teacher at Park Vale School
Janine, a secretary at London Coldfire Construction
Carl, a pupil at Park Vale School
Marco Goss (who posed as Jay Stafford)
June Goss (who posed as Heidi Stafford)
Nathan Goss

Notes

External links

Recurring characters in Doctor Who
Television characters introduced in 2005
Fictional characters with superhuman strength
Fictional extraterrestrial life forms
Fictional characters with superhuman senses
Fictional characters who can move at superhuman speeds
Fictional criminals
Fictional impostors
Fictional families
Fictional hunters
Fictional murderers
The Sarah Jane Adventures characters